Henryk Marek (born 8 January 1939) is a Polish cross-country skier. He competed in the men's 30 kilometre event at the 1964 Winter Olympics.

References

1939 births
Living people
Polish male cross-country skiers
Olympic cross-country skiers of Poland
Cross-country skiers at the 1964 Winter Olympics
People from Bielsko County